Tango in the Night is the fourteenth studio album by British-American rock band Fleetwood Mac, released on 13 April 1987. It is the fifth and final studio album from the band's most successful lineup of Lindsey Buckingham, Mick Fleetwood, Christine McVie, John McVie, and Stevie Nicks following Buckingham's departure later that year, though the band's 2003 album, Say You Will, includes limited contributions from Christine.

Produced by Buckingham with Richard Dashut, Tango in the Night began as one of Buckingham's solo projects, but by 1985, the production had morphed into Fleetwood Mac's next record. It contains several hit singles, including four US top 20 hits: "Big Love" ( 5), "Seven Wonders" (No. 19), "Little Lies" (No. 4), and "Everywhere" (No. 14). Two additional songs, "Family Man" (No. 90) and "Isn't It Midnight", were released as singles to lower chart success. Tango in the Night has sold over 15 million copies worldwide. In March 2017, remastered deluxe editions of Tango in the Night were released, the first a double-CD set and the second a 3CD/1DVD/1-LP boxset.

The cover art for the album is a painting by Australian artist Brett-Livingstone Strong that was hanging in Buckingham's home. The painting is an homage to the 19th-century French painter Henri Rousseau, emulating his colourful jungle theme works such as The Snake Charmer and The Repast of the Lion. The painting was also used as the cover art for "Big Love", the album's lead single.

History
After the completion of the Mirage Tour in 1982, four members of Fleetwood Mac released five solo albums, with varying degrees of success. Mick Fleetwood, Christine McVie, and Lindsey Buckingham each released one, while Stevie Nicks issued two.

In 1985, Christine McVie was called to record a cover of Elvis Presley's "Can't Help Falling in Love" for the soundtrack of the movie A Fine Mess. McVie brought Richard Dashut, who had engineered and produced Rumours, Tusk, and Mirage, on board to assist with the album's production. Buckingham, Fleetwood, and John McVie were enlisted to supply the instrumentation. Greg Droman, a relatively new producer at the time, was also brought in to participate. At the suggestion of Joe Walsh, Droman relocated to Los Angeles, where he bumped into Dashut at a recording studio owned by Captain & Tennille, and the two of them "just hit it off". A few weeks later, Droman worked with Buckingham on "Time Bomb Town" for the Back to the Future film soundtrack. Buckingham retained Droman to engineer what was intended to be his third solo album, although the project eventually morphed into a Fleetwood Mac album once other members got involved.

Dashut and Droman recalled that the album's recording sessions were particularly tedious, even by Fleetwood Mac standards. At one point, they experimented with slowing down songs in order to find suitable textures. Sometimes, this would double the song duration, which made for "a brutal ten minutes to listen to", according to Droman. By tripling and quadrupling these mixes, they managed to make each song sound "open and airy".

Although the record took eighteen months to complete, Stevie Nicks spent a total of two weeks in the studio with the band, as she was promoting her third solo record, Rock a Little, throughout this period. Nicks sent demos of her songs to the band, recorded while she was on tour, for them to work on in her absence. "Welcome to the Room... Sara" was inspired by her thirty-day stay at the Betty Ford Center to overcome her cocaine addiction in October 1986 (Nicks used the pseudonym "Sara Anderson" when she checked into the facility).

When Nicks did go to the studio, she often felt unmotivated: "I can remember going up there and not being happy to even be there... I didn't go very often". Vocal sessions took place in Buckingham's master bedroom, where Nicks frequently recorded her parts for Buckingham and McVie's songs under the influence of alcohol; Buckingham deleted most of Nicks' vocals after she left the studio. "I'm not blaming him for that because I'm sure they totally sucked. Vocals done when you're crazy and drinking a cup of brandy probably aren't usually going to be great".

Buckingham recorded some of the vocals using a Fairlight, an early sampling synthesizer. On "When I See You Again", he re-assembled separately recorded takes of Nicks, explaining, "I had to pull performances out of words and lines and make parts that sounded like her that weren't her". "That was in my estimation when everybody in the band was personally at their worst. By the time we did Tango in the Night, everybody was leading their lives in a way that they would not be too proud of today".

With pressure on Buckingham to keep the project focused and moving forward, things came to a head shortly after the release of Tango in the Night. At a band meeting at Christine McVie's house to discuss the accompanying tour, he announced his departure, which infuriated Nicks. The two ex-lovers then had to be restrained after an ensuing argument turned into a physical altercation. "The album was well received", noted Mick Fleetwood. He continued, "Somewhat sadly, the kudos of that was never really fully attributed to Lindsey because he wasn't present... He was coerced and persuaded to do that album—mainly by me. And, to his credit, he put aside everything that he'd dreamt of doing, including making his own album, for Fleetwood Mac, but then realised that he'd made a mistake... Lindsey was not being heard. We just didn't get it".

Following Buckingham's sudden departure, guitarists Rick Vito and Billy Burnette were hired to replace him on the subsequent tour and remained as full members of the band until the 1990s.

Commercial performance
Tango in the Night is the band's second-biggest-selling studio album after the phenomenally successful Rumours, which was released ten years earlier. The intervening albums, Tusk (1979) and Mirage (1982), although big sellers in key territories, had not matched their predecessor's huge success. Tango in the Night was a worldwide hit, with several singles becoming popular all over the world. Christine McVie's "Little Lies" and "Everywhere" in particular appear on several 1980s compilation albums.

The album was a success in the United States, where it peaked at no. 7 for three weeks, spending more than seven months within the top 20 and more than ten months within the top 40. It was certified 3× Platinum in October 2000 for selling three million copies in the US. Four singles from the album reached the Billboard top 20: "Big Love" (No. 5), "Little Lies" (No. 4), "Everywhere" (No. 14), and "Seven Wonders" (No. 19). The album was particularly successful in the UK, where it reached no. 1 three times during 1987–88 for a total of five weeks and spent more than eight months within the top 10 of the UK albums chart. It is the seventh-biggest-selling album of the 1980s in the UK, being certified 8× Platinum (2.4 million copies), and it is still currently one of the UK's top 100 best-selling albums of all time. Three singles were top 10 hits in Britain: "Big Love" (No. 9), "Little Lies" (No. 5), and "Everywhere" (No. 4). A total of six singles were eventually taken from the album over a period of fifteen months. The album spent 115 weeks in the top 75 of the UK Albums Chart.

"Big Love", "Seven Wonders", "Little Lies", "Family Man", and "Everywhere" were all released as extended 12" remixes in most territories.

Outtakes
Four songs from the Tango in the Night sessions did not make the final album cut and subsequently became B-sides. "You and I (Part I)" was the B-side to the single release of "Big Love". "Seven Wonders" was released with the Stevie Nicks-penned instrumental track "Book of Miracles" as its B-side. This eventually became the song "Juliet" on Nicks' 1989 solo album, The Other Side of the Mirror. McVie's "Ricky" was the B-side to "Little Lies" and Lindsey Buckingham's "Down Endless Street" was issued as the B-side to "Family Man". Nicks also contributed two additional songs that failed to make the final cut. "Ooh My Love", like "Juliet", eventually made its way onto Nicks' solo album, while "Joan of Arc" remains unreleased. "I still want to record it", she explained. "The song has its really good moments but it's not good enough to go out as that version".

Two additional tracks, both co-written by McVie and Buckingham, also failed to appear on the final product: "Where We Belong", which incorporates Buckingham's "folksy fingerpicking" and McVie's "brilliant pop simplicity" was written as a duet, but was later abandoned in favor of other songs. The other, "Special Kind of Love", was described by Pitchfork as a "completely developed Buckingham song". Both tracks subsequently appeared on the deluxe edition of Tango in the Night.

An alternate mix of "Isn't It Midnight" was issued on the 1992 four-disc box set, 25 Years – The Chain, and is substantially different from the version included on the album. It has different backing vocals and a lack of guitar effects, which were eventually added by Buckingham in the final mix of the song.

Deluxe edition

A deluxe remaster of Tango in the Night was issued in 2017. The bonus disc includes both halves of "You and I", released and combined for the first time, as well as the majority of the tracks mentioned above. Although long-awaited, the re-release received some criticism for its lack of content. Disc 2 had an extra twenty minutes' worth of space that was not filled, and the live concert DVD was not included. Music videos on the DVD were not taken from their original master and 5.1 surround sound was not issued either.

Track listing

Personnel
Fleetwood Mac
 Lindsey Buckingham – vocals, guitars, keyboards, Fairlight CMI, synthesizer programming, bass, lap harp, percussion, drum programming
 Stevie Nicks – vocals, tambourine
 Christine McVie – vocals, keyboards, synthesizers
 John McVie – bass guitar
 Mick Fleetwood – drums, percussion

Production
 Lindsey Buckingham – producer, arrangements, additional engineer, cover concept
 Richard Dashut – producer, cover concept
 Greg Droman – engineer
 Stephen Marcussen – mastering at Precision Lacquer (Hollywood, California)
 John Courage – studio coordinator
 Roy Hopper – studio crew
 Ray Lindsey – studio crew
 Steve Matteucci – studio crew
 Brett-Livingstone Strong – cover painting
 Greg Gorman – cover photography
 Jeri Heiden – art direction

Charts

Weekly charts

Year-end charts

Decade-end charts

Certifications and sales

References

Bibliography
 </ref>

1987 albums
Albums produced by Lindsey Buckingham
Albums produced by Richard Dashut
Albums recorded in a home studio
Fleetwood Mac albums
Warner Records albums